Aliona Valeriyivna Babak  (born September 27, 1969) is a Ukrainian politician who was appointed in August 2019 as Minister of Regional Development. On 16 January 2020 she announced her resignation. On 4 February 2020 she was formerly dismissed by Parliament (Verkhovna Rada).

Babak was a member of the Parliament of Ukraine of the 8th convocation, member of parliamentary faction Samopomich Union. She was elected to the Verkhovna Rada in the October 2014 Ukrainian parliamentary election, appearing 8th on the party list of Samopomich Union. She left parliament in March 2017 claiming "I'm not a politician, I'm more of an expert. Political activity is difficult for me as a person."

Biography 
Aliona Babak was born in Kryvyi Rih, Dnipropetrovsk Oblast. Graduated with honours from the Kyiv State Pedagogic Institute of Foreign Languages, attaining the qualification of foreign languages teacher (English and French) in 1996.

In 1996, she won the Edmund Muskie Fund grant for studying in the US, which allowed her to attain master's degree in Business Administration and Finance from Old Dominion University, Virginia.

Since 1998, Babak has worked as an entrepreneur, manager of international projects, head specialist on pricing and financial management in housing and local development. In 2004, she co-founded and became a member of managing board of the charity organisation 'Local Development Institute', where she specialises on financial management of housing. She has written 30 academic papers on reforming housing and communal services and regulations for the natural monopolists.

She is a member of a working group on reforming of housing and communal services with the Ministry of Regional Development, Construction, Housing and Communal Services of Ukraine. Member of the Consulting Council at the National Commission on State Regulation of Communal Services.

See also 
 List of members of the parliament of Ukraine, 2014–19
 Honcharuk Government

References

External links 
 MinRegion  (in Ukrainian)

1969 births
Living people
Politicians from Kryvyi Rih
Old Dominion University alumni
Eighth convocation members of the Verkhovna Rada
Self Reliance (political party) politicians
Regional development and construction ministers of Ukraine
Women government ministers of Ukraine
21st-century Ukrainian women politicians
Women members of the Verkhovna Rada